Augustin Cupșa (born 1980, in Craiova, Romania) is Romanian writer and screenwriter. He initially obtained his diploma as a psychiatrist and practiced for some years in Bucharest and Paris. His first novel, Perforatorii, published in 2006, won him the Opera Prima prize awarded by the Writers Union of Romania at the National Union of Romanian Patronage Gala and the presence at Jeux de la Francophonie 2009, section Littérature, in Beirut, representing Romania.

Work
In 2013 he was a writer in residence at International House of Authors in Graz, Austria.

His second novel, Așa să crească iarba pe noi, published in 2017, was shortlisted for PEN Prize Romania, for the Writers Union of Romania Prize Constantin Țoiu  and was nominated for the European Union Prize for Literature 2019.

As a screenwriter he won the HBO Romania Prize for short script at Transilvania International Film Festival in 2006 and later on the European Alliance for Television and Culture bursary for screenwriting in Geneva. He collaborated with HBO to adapt the original series BeTipul in Romania (În derivă, 2010–2012). He co-wrote Ceață(Fog, 2017) which won the Grand Prix at Festival Premiers Plans d`Angers, Sankt Petersburg Message to Man International Film Festival and the Special Mention of the Jury at Brussels International Film Festival. He also co-wrote Fructe necoapte (Unripped fruits, 2018)

In 2020 he was selected for a writing residence in Tirana, Albania within Reading Balkans Residency. In 2021 a revised and completed edition of his short stories volume "Marile bucurii și marile tristeți” was released by Humanitas Publishing House

Bibliography 

Perforatorii (novel), Cartea Românească Publishing, 2006

Profesorul Bumb și macii suedezi (short stories), Cartea Românească Publishing, 2009

Marile bucurii și marile tristeți [Les grandes joies et les grandes tristesses] (short stories), Trei Publishing, 2013, Humanitas Publishing House, 2021

Velike radosti i velike tuge (Serbian translation of Marile bucurii și marile tristeți), Partizanska Knjiga, 2017

Așa să crească iarba pe noi (novel), Humanitas Publishing, 2017

Filmography 

În Derivă, HBO Romania Productions and Factor Films, 2010, 2012)

Ceață (Fog), Axel Films, 2017

Fructe necoapte (Unripped fruits), Libra Film Productions, 2019

References

External links 
The Cold - Augustin Cupsa

1980 births
Living people
People from Craiova
Romanian screenwriters
Romanian psychiatrists